Air Power is a historical educational television series broadcast in the 1950s over the CBS television network dealing with the rise of aviation as a military weapon. It was produced in cooperation with the United States Air Force.  The series also featured a musical score composed by Norman Dello Joio and conducted by Alfredo Antonini.

Synopsis
Air Power told the story of the rise of aviation as a military weapon, covering military aviation history from the invention of the airplane through the supersonic aircraft and missiles of the mid-1950s, and also discussed rockets and the future of aviation. Air Power included the stories of some of the historical heroes of aviation and the leading aviation figures of the mid-20th century.

Cast
Walter Cronkite narrated all 26 episodes. Eddie Rickenbacker co-narrated the November 18, 1956, episode on the early days of aviation. Michael Redgrave co-narrated the December 5, 1956, episode on the Battle of Britain. Art Carney co-narrated the December 12, 1956, episode on stunt flying and wing walking.

Production
The CBS Public Affairs Department produced Air Power in cooperation with the United States Air Force. Norman Dello Joio composed the musical score for the series, and Alfredo Antonini conducted it.

Broadcast history
The series was originally broadcast during the 1956-1957 television season on Sunday at 6:30 p.m. Eastern Time from November 11, 1956, to May 5, 1957. Reruns were broadcast from May 4 to October 19, 1958, also at 6:30 p.m. Eastern.

Episodes
Source:

References

External links
 
 Air Power episode "Counterblast" opening and closing credits on YouTube
 Air Power episode "The Early Days" on YouTube

1956 American television series debuts
1957 American television series endings
1950s American television series
American educational television series
Black-and-white American television shows
CBS News
Documentary television series about aviation
English-language television shows
Historical television series
Television series by CBS Studios